Madridejos may refer to:
 Madridejos, Cebu, a 4th class municipality in the province of Cebu, Philippines
 Madridejos, Toledo, a town in the province of Toledo, Spain